David the Scot (died c. 1138) was a Welsh or Irish cleric who was Bishop of Bangor from 1120 to 1138.

There is some doubt as to David's nationality, as he is variously described as Welsh or Irish. Many Irish men living outside Ireland at this time had the designation Scottus, which originally denoted an Irishman, not a Scottish person. He was master of the cathedral school of Würzburg before 1110 - resting place of Irish missionary St. Kilian and St. Kilian's Abbey, Würzburg - and in that year accompanied the Emperor Henry V to Italy. He wrote an account of this expedition.

He was elected Bishop of Bangor, at the instigation of Gruffudd ap Cynan, king of Gwynedd, in 1120. The previous bishop, Hervé, had been expelled from his see by the Welsh, and deadlock between Gruffudd and the king of England concerning the choice of a new bishop had resulted in the see being vacant for around twenty years. Gruffudd threatened to get the new Bishop consecrated in Ireland, but eventually King Henry I of England agreed to the appointment of David to the see on condition that he accepted the supremacy of Canterbury. David was consecrated by Ralph, Archbishop of Canterbury on 4 April 1120 at Westminster.

David was responsible for the rebuilding of Bangor Cathedral, the earliest surviving parts of which date to his episcopate. In this he was aided by a large grant of money from Gruffudd ap Cynan. David is last recorded in attendance at the deathbed of Gruffudd ap Cynan in 1137. It is thought that he may have returned to Würzburg as a monk shortly before his death.

See also

 Josephus Scottus (died between 791 and 804), Irish scholar, diplomat, poet, and ecclesiastic
 Johannes Scotus Eriugena (c. 815 – c. 877), Irish theologian, Neoplatonist philosopher, and poet
 Aaron Scotus (fl. late 10th century – 18 November 1052), Irish abbot and musician
 Blessed Marianus Scotus (fl. 1067–88), Irish abbot and scribe.

References
John Edward Lloyd (1911) The history of Wales from the earliest times to the Edwardian conquest (Longmans, Green & Co.)

External links
Notes on David at www.british-history.ac.uk

1138 deaths
Bishops of Bangor
12th-century Irish Roman Catholic priests
12th-century English Roman Catholic bishops
Medieval Gaels
Irish writers
12th-century travel writers
Irish travel writers
Year of birth unknown
Medieval Scottish clergy